Charles Henry Sexton (15 September 1906 – June 1994) was a British international  sports shooter.

Sports shooting career
He competed in the 50 metre pistol event at the 1968 Summer Olympics.

He represented England and won a gold medal in the 50 metres free pistol, at the 1966 British Empire and Commonwealth Games in Kingston, Jamaica.

References

1906 births
1994 deaths
British male sport shooters
Olympic shooters of Great Britain
Shooters at the 1968 Summer Olympics
Sportspeople from Essex
Shooters at the 1966 British Empire and Commonwealth Games
Commonwealth Games medallists in shooting
Commonwealth Games gold medallists for England
20th-century British people
Medallists at the 1966 British Empire and Commonwealth Games